Hurricane Sergio was the third strongest Pacific hurricane in the month of November on record.

Sergio produced light rainfall along the coast of Mexico, though its effects were minimal. The formation of Sergio marked the 2006 season as the busiest in 12 years and the first season in which more than one tropical storm formed in November. Sergio, in addition to being the strongest hurricane after November 1, was also the longest-lived Pacific tropical cyclone in November, lasting a total of seven days.

Meteorological history

A tropical wave crossed Central America and entered the eastern Pacific Ocean on November 7. Later that day, Dvorak classification began on the disturbance, and the convection continued to organize. Early on November 13, the National Hurricane Center indicated the possibility of the system developing into a tropical depression. Operationally, the depression was not upgraded until eleven hours later.

Initially, the tropical depression tracked to the northwest, and was forecast to peak as a  tropical storm while continuing on a northwest motion. Located within an area of weak wind shear, deep convection increased near the center, and banding features became more pronounced. Anticyclonic flow aloft and a moist troposphere allowed the depression to intensity into Tropical Storm Sergio on November 14. Shortly after becoming a tropical storm, Sergio turned to the southeast, believed to be due to the flow associated with a mid- to upper-level trough to its northeast. With a small, distinct eye located in the center of the deep convection, Sergio rapidly intensified to attain peak winds of  about 6 hours after becoming a hurricane.

Shortly after peaking, the hurricane turned to the north and gradually weakened as wind shear from an upper-level trough to its northwest increased. By early on November 17, the low-cloud circulation became partially exposed on the west side of the deep convection, and it is estimated that Sergio weakened to a tropical storm later that day. A ridge to its north and northeast turned the storm to the northwest and later to the west as Sergio gradually weakened. Deep convection reformed near the center on November 18, resulting in a slight increase in winds, though vertical shear quickly weakened it again. The remnants of Sergio continued westward for about a day before the minimal amount of convection diminished.

Impact and records
No tropical cyclone warnings or watches were issued in relation to Sergio. Several storm advisories indicated a slight threat to coastal regions of Mexico; the National Hurricane Center assessed a 29% probability of tropical storm-force winds affecting Barra de Navidad in Jalisco.

After Rosa formed a few days before Sergio, November 2006 became the first since 1961 to have more than one storm in the month. The hurricane is currently the third strongest in the month, as well as the longest-lasting.

See also

 Other storms of the same name
 List of Pacific hurricanes
 Timeline of the 2006 Pacific hurricane season

References

External links

The NHC's archive on Hurricane Sergio.

Sergio 2006
Sergio 2006
Sergio 2006
Sergio